During the 1911–12 English football season, Brentford competed in the Southern League First Division. A forgettable season saw the club finish in mid-table and advance to the first round proper of the FA Cup.

Season summary

Brentford secretary-manager Fred Halliday strengthened his squad in preparation for the 1911–12 Southern League First Division season, bringing in left back Walter Spratt, outside right Billy Brawn, inside forward Patsy Hendren and centre forward Thomas Graham. He would later sign forwards Fred Rouse and Willis Rippon in a bid to improve the team's goalscoring, with Rippon going on to finish the season as top-scorer with 20 goals. Full back Steve Buxton was sold to Oldham Athletic on the eve of the season for a £425 fee, in a bid to settle some of the club's debts. The sale of Geordie Reid to Clyde for a club record £500 fee in September 1911 helped pay off further debts.

Brentford finished the season in 14th place and advanced to the first round proper of the FA Cup, taking Crystal Palace to a replay before going out of the competition.  The 9–0 league defeat to Coventry City on 27 December 1911 is the heaviest in club history.

League table

Results
Brentford's goal tally listed first.

Legend

Southern League First Division

FA Cup

 Source: 100 Years Of Brentford

Playing squad 
Players' ages are as of the opening day of the 1911–12 season.

 Source: Brentford Football Club Official Handbook 1911–12, 100 Years Of Brentford, Football League Players' Records 1888 to 1939

Coaching staff

Statistics

Appearances and goals

Players listed in italics left the club mid-season.
Source: 100 Years Of Brentford

Goalscorers 

Players listed in italics left the club mid-season.
Source: 100 Years Of Brentford

Management

Summary

Transfers & loans 
Cricketers are not included in this list.

Notes

References 

Brentford F.C. seasons
Brentford